Jean-Louis Dumont (born 6 April 1944 in Jonville-en-Woëvre) is a member of the National Assembly of France.  He represents the Meuse department,  and is a member of the Socialiste, radical, citoyen et divers gauche.

References

1944 births
Living people
People from Meuse (department)
Socialist Party (France) politicians
Deputies of the 12th National Assembly of the French Fifth Republic
Deputies of the 13th National Assembly of the French Fifth Republic
Deputies of the 14th National Assembly of the French Fifth Republic